The third season of Chicago Fire, an American drama television series with executive producer Dick Wolf, and producers Derek Haas, Michael Brandt, and Matt Olmstead, premiered on Tuesday, September 23, 2014, at 10 pm on NBC television network and concluded on May 12, 2015. The season contained 23 episodes.

Overview
The show follows the lives of the firefighters and paramedics working at the Chicago Fire Department at the firehouse of Engine 51, Truck 81, Squad 3, Ambulance 61 and Battalion 25.

Episode 19 served as a backdoor pilot for a new spin-off, called Chicago Med.

Cast and characters

Main cast
 Jesse Spencer as Lieutenant Matthew Casey, Truck 81 (23 episodes)
 Taylor Kinney as Lieutenant Kelly Severide, Squad 3 (23 episodes)
 Monica Raymund as Paramedic in Charge/Firefighter Candidate Gabriela Dawson, Ambulance 61/Truck 81 (23 episodes)
 Charlie Barnett as Firefighter/Paramedic in Charge Peter Mills, Squad 3/Ambulance 61 (20 episodes)
 Kara Killmer as Paramedic Sylvie Brett, Ambulance 61 (23 episodes)
 David Eigenberg as Firefighter Christopher Herrmann, Truck 81 (23 episodes)
 Yuri Sardarov as Firefighter Brian "Otis" Zvonecek, Truck 81 (23 episodes)
 Joe Minoso as Firefighter Joe Cruz, Truck 81/Squad 3 (23 episodes)
 Christian Stolte as Firefighter Randy "Mouch" McHolland, Truck 81 (23 episodes)
 Eamonn Walker as Chief Wallace Boden, Battalion 25 (23 episodes)

Recurring
 Randy Flagler as Firefighter Harold Capp, Rescue Squad 3
 Anthony Ferraris as Firefighter Tony, Rescue Squad 3 (firefighter in real life too)
 Edwin Hodge as Firefighter Rick Newhouse, Rescue Squad 3 (10 episodes)
 Melissa Ponzio as Donna Robbins-Boden (10 episodes)
 Warren Christie as Firefighter Scott Rice, Rescue Squad 3 (7 episodes)
 Gordon Clapp as Chaplain Orlovsky (5 episodes)
 Kenny Johnson as Lieutenant Tommy Welch, Truck 66/Firefighter, Rescue Squad 3 (5 episodes)
 Eric Mabius as Jack Nesbitt (5 episodes)
 Yaya DaCosta as April Sexton (4 episodes)
 Izabella Miko as Katya (4 episodes)
 Richard Roundtree as Wallace Boden, Sr. (4 episodes)
 Serinda Swan as Brittany Baker (4 episodes)
 Lauren German as Leslie Shay (3 episodes, pictures and video memories)
 Dora Madison as Paramedic in Charge, Jessica "Chili" Chilton, Ambulance 61 (3 episodes)
 James Russo as Papa Lullo (3 episodes)
 Alexandra Metz as Elise Mills (2 episodes)

Crossover characters
 Amy Morton as Sergeant Trudy Platt (6 episodes)
 Brian Geraghty as Officer Sean Roman (5 episodes)
 Jon Seda as Detective Antonio Dawson (5 episodes)
 Jason Beghe as Sergeant Henry "Hank" Voight (4 episodes)
 Marina Squerciati as Officer Kim Burgess (3 episodes)
 Jesse Lee Soffer as Detective Jay Halstead (3 episodes)
 Sophia Bush as Detective Erin Lindsay (2 episodes)
 Patrick John Flueger as Officer Adam Ruzek (2 episodes)
 LaRoyce Hawkins as Officer Kevin Atwater (2 episodes)
 Samuel Hunt as Greg "Mouse" Gerwitz (1 episode)
 Kelli Giddish as Detective Amanda Rollins (1 episode)
 Mariska Hargitay as Sergeant Olivia Benson (1 episode)
 Tamara Tunie as M.E. Melinda Warner (1 episode)

Episodes

Production
NBC renewed Chicago Fire for a third season on March 19, 2014 which premiered on September 23 that same year.

Crossovers
On September 29, 2014, it was announced that Wolf's shows Chicago P.D., Chicago Fire and Law & Order: Special Victims Unit would be doing a three-part crossover event on November 11–12, 2014, starting with Chicago Fire and ending with Law & Order: Special Victims Unit, and Chicago P.D. On January 22, 2015, another crossover between Chicago Fire, Law & Order: Special Victims Unit, and Chicago P.D. was announced, to have "more integrated storytelling" than the first. The episodes aired on April 28–29, 2015.

Ratings

Home media
The DVD release of season three was released in Region 1 on September 1, 2015.

References

External links

2014 American television seasons
2015 American television seasons
Chicago Fire (TV series) seasons